Pavel Drăgoi (born 6 February 1956) is a Romanian judoka. He competed in the men's open category event at the 1980 Summer Olympics.

References

1956 births
Living people
Romanian male judoka
Olympic judoka of Romania
Judoka at the 1980 Summer Olympics
Sportspeople from Alba Iulia